Danxia Zichun (1064–1117) (Hànyǔ pīnyīn Dānxiá Zichún) was a Zen Buddhist monk during the Song Dynasty. He was born in a city called Zitong, which is in modern Sichuan Province. He is buried in south of Mt Hong near the modern city of Wuhan. While not a particularly notable monk himself, his three students, Hongzhi Zhengjue, Zhenxie Qingliao, Huizhao Qingyu, were each especially famous during their lifetimes. He is the only student of Furong Daokai that has a collection of recorded sayings that has survived to the present. In these sayings, he advocated a silent illumination approach to seated meditation. For example, he is recorded as saying, "You must completely let go of all worldly concerns and sit totally still in the dry wood hall. You must die a turn and then in this death establish everything in the whole universe."

References

Chan Buddhist monks
1064 births
1117 deaths
Song dynasty Buddhist monks
11th-century Chinese people